Ohio Institute of Health Careers, with campus locations in Columbus and Elyria, Ohio, provides students with training in the healthcare field. 

Originally established in Columbus in 1966, the Elyria campus opened in 2003. Ohio Institute of Health Careers is accredited by the Accrediting Commission of Career Schools and Colleges of Technology (ACCSCT) and offers career training in the areas of medical assisting, dental assisting, massage therapy and medical administration.

External links
 Ohio Institute of Health Careers official web site
 Accrediting Commission of Career Schools and Colleges of Technology official web site

Massage therapy
Universities and colleges in Columbus, Ohio
Educational institutions established in 1966
1966 establishments in Ohio
Education in Lorain County, Ohio